Kamma  Bodil Flæng  (born 30 March 1976) is a Danish retired football defender. She was part of the Denmark women's national football team.  She competed at the 1996 Summer Olympics, playing three matches. At the club level, she played for HEI Århus.

See also
 Denmark at the 1996 Summer Olympics

References

External links
 
 
 Scoresway profile

1976 births
Living people
VSK Aarhus (women) players
Danish women's footballers
Place of birth missing (living people)
Footballers at the 1996 Summer Olympics
Olympic footballers of Denmark
Women's association football defenders
1995 FIFA Women's World Cup players
Denmark women's international footballers